Kampong Kuala Tutong or also commonly known as Kuala Tutong is a village in Tutong District, Brunei, within the mukim of Pekan Tutong. The postcode for Kampong Kuala Tutong is TA3341.

References 

Kuala Tutong